Joanna Sime (born 31 May 1962) is a junior and senior international gymnast who represented Great Britain in the late 1970s.

Competition record
Major championships competed in:
 World School Games, Orleans, France, 1976. Gold medalist team event, bronze medal on balance beam.
 Commonwealth Games, Edmonton, Canada. England team silver medalist. 1978 1978 Commonwealth Games
 World Championships, Strasbourg, France, 1978
 World Championships, Fort Worth, Texas, US 1979
 European Championships, Copenhagen, Denmark, 1979

Invitational competitions:
 Golden Sands Tournament, Varna, Bulgaria 1976,
 Golden Sands Tournament, Varna, Bulgaria 1978 (bronze medal balance beam)
 National High School All Around Invitational, Chicago, US, 1978
 Hungarian Invitational, Pecs, Hungary, 1979
 Romanian Invitational, Bucharest, Romania, 1980.
 Moscow News Tournament, Russia, 1981 Riga Tournament, Latvia, 1981

National championships:
 British National Junior Champion 1976
 British National Apparatus Champion 1978
 British Uneven Bar Champion 1978
 British Floor Champion 1978

International meets:

 GB vs Romania
 GB vs Bulgaria
 GB vs Germany
 GB vs France
 GB vs Sweden
 GB vs Denmark
 GB vs Holland
 GB vs Canada
 GB vs Hungary
 GB vs USSR
 GB vs Poland
 GB vs Finland
 GB vs Penn State University

Career
Honors: The first unanimous decision in the history of the Tournament; Joanna was voted "Miss Moskovski Novosti" by 250 International journalists as the most charming and beautiful gymnast at the Moscow News Tournament, Russia, 1981.

Awarded the Honor of Master Gymnast by the British Amateur Gymnastics Association for participation in three world-level events.

Sime participated as celebrity sportswomen in children's TV show We are the Champions with Ron Pickering in 1978. We Are the Champions (TV series).

NCAA: Received a full athletic scholarship to the Pennsylvania State University from 1981 to 1985. Received the NCAA Team bronze medal in 1982, coached by Judy Markell Avener. NCAA Women's Gymnastics championship

Professional gymnastics: Took part in the Kurt Thomas's Professional Gymnastics show in Orlando, Florida, 1985.
"Gymnastics America".

Biography
Sime was coached by her late father, Max Sime, a graduate of Balliol College, Oxford, and a well-known psychologist for his innovative work in cognitive ergonomics and human-computer interaction. He worked for the Medical Research Council (UK) and was based at the University of Sheffield, where he headed a scientific research team.

Max Sime was awarded the title of Master Coach by the British Amateur Gymnastics Association, for producing several international gymnasts for Britain, another being Joanna's sister, Katie Sime. He was also made an Honorary Life Member for his contributions to the Woman's Technical Committee and the Board of Control. The "Max Sime Memorial" is awarded each year at the British National Championships to the most artistic and stylish Gymnast to commemorate his considerable contribution to the sport.

Joanna Sime also trained in Washington, D.C., with Margie and Greg Weiss, parents to top US figure skater, Michael Weiss
and also coaches to several National US Champions, notably Stephanie Willem, Shari Mann and Jackie Casello. Gregor Weiss

As a result of a Sports Aid Foundation Scholarship, while competing at The European Championships in Copenhagen, Sime  arranged with then president of the FIG, Yuri Titov, a training trip to the Soviet Union at the Central Army Club in Moscow, where she worked with reigning world champion, Elena Mukhina and became good friends. There she was coached by Mikail Klimenko and Victor Razumov and began her studies in Russian, for which she received an honors degree from Penn State University later in her career.

Penn State Nittany Lions NCAA Women's Gymnastics championship

References

British female artistic gymnasts
Gymnasts at the 1978 Commonwealth Games
1962 births
Living people
Sportspeople from Sheffield
Commonwealth Games medallists in gymnastics
Commonwealth Games silver medallists for England
Medallists at the 1978 Commonwealth Games